Milašiūnai (formerly ) is a village in Kėdainiai district municipality, in Kaunas County, in central Lithuania. According to the 2011 census, the village was uninhabited.

It was an okolica (a property of the Daugėlavičiai, Urnėžiai, Čulickiai families) at the beginning of the 20th century. There was a windmill nearby.

Demography

References

Villages in Kaunas County
Kėdainiai District Municipality